The Bundjalung people, also spelt Bunjalung, Badjalang and Bandjalang, are Aboriginal Australians who are the original custodians of a region based roughly around the northern coastal area of New South Wales, and a portion of south-east Queensland, with the region stretching as far north as Beaudesert, and stretching south to around Grafton.

Bundjalung people all share descent from ancestors who once spoke as their first, preferred language one or more of the dialects of the Lower-Richmond branch of the Yugambeh-Bundjalung language family.

The Arakwal of Byron Bay count themselves as one of the Bundjalung peoples.

Language

Bundjalung is a Pama-Nyungan language. It has two unusual features: certain syllables are strongly stressed while others are "slurred", and it classifies gender into four classes: (a) masculine (b) feminine (c) arboreal and (d) neuter.

Country

The coastal Widje clan ventured no further than Rappville.

Alternative names

According to Norman Tindale, various spellings and other names were used for the Bundjalung people:

 Badjelang (paidjal/badjal means "man")
 Bandjalang, Bandjalong
 Budulung
 Buggul
 Bundela, Bundel
 Bunjellung
 Paikalyung, Paikalyug
 Watchee
 Widje (clan or clans at Evans Head)
 Woomargou

Culture

Initiation ceremony
According to R. H. Mathews, the Bundjalung rite of transition into manhood began with a cleared space called a walloonggurra some distance from the main camp. On the evening the novices are taken from their mothers around dusk, the men sing their way to this bora ground where a small bullroarer (dhalguñgwn) is whirled.

Musical instruments
The Bundjalung used a variety of instruments, including blowing on a eucalyptus leaf, creating a bird-like sound. Clapsticks were used to establish a drumbeat rhythm on ceremonial dancing occasions. When striking the emu-caller at one end with the open palm it sounds like an emu. This decoy attracts the bird out of the bush making it an easy prey.

Native title
The application had been launched in 1996, and the first determination made in 2013. Included in the land is a bora ring of great cultural significance near Coraki.

Notable people
 Troy Cassar-Daley, country singer, winner of ARIA and Deadly awards, among others
 Melissa Lucashenko, author, winner of 2013 Walkley Award for non-fiction and 2019 Miles Franklin Award
 Sharlene Allsopp, author and poet, winner The Ford Memorial Prize, 2021
 Madeleine and Miah Madden, actresses, half-sisters with Bundjalung heritage through their father
 Lambert McBride, activist for Aboriginal citizenship rights during the 1960s
 Digby Moran, artist
 Nikita Ridgeway, tattoo artist and graphic designer
 Tamala Shelton, actress
 Rhoda Roberts, journalist, arts advisor and artistic director
 Anthony Mundine, former boxer, rugby league star
 Evelyn Araluen, poet, researcher, co-editor

See also
 Bundjalung Nation Timeline
 Dirawong

Notes

Citations

Sources

 citing Yamba Yesterday, Howland and Lee, Yamba Centenary Committee.

External links
 Bundjalung of Byron Bay Aboriginal Corporation, representing the Bundjalung and Arakwal people, land and waters
 Bibliography of Bundjalung language and people resources, at the Australian Institute of Aboriginal and Torres Strait Islander Studies
 "Australia's Sacred Sites Part 5 - Byron Bay" ABC Radio's Spirit of Things (October 2002; Retrieved 21 May 2008
 A Walk in the Park Series: "New South Wales - Arakwal National Park" ABC Radio (December 2004) Retrieved 21 May 2008
 "Badjalang" AusAnthrop Australian Aboriginal tribal database.  Retrieved 20 May 2008
 Bunjalung of Byron Bay (Arakwal) Indigenous Land Use Agreement (ILUA)  Retrieved 21 May 2008
 New South Wales Department of Environment and Climate Change Aboriginal cultural heritage webpage Living on the frontier Retrieved 21 May 2008